Calvin Grove (born August 5, 1962) is an American former professional boxer who was the Featherweight champion of the world.

Professional career

Grove turned pro in 1982 and in 1988 captured the IBF featherweight title with a TKO over Antonio Rivera.  He defended the belt once before losing it to Jorge Páez later that same year.  Grove was knocked down three times in the 15th round, a decisive factor in him losing the majority decision.  In a rematch with Paez the following year Grove was TKO'd in the 11th. Grove later moved up in weight and in 1992 challenged WBC super featherweight title holder Azumah Nelson, but lost a decision.  Grove later moved up in weight again, and in 1994 took on WBC lightweight title holder Miguel Ángel González, but lost via TKO.  Grove retired in 1998 after losing via 1st-round KO to Kostya Tszyu.

Two of Grove's most notable victories occurred over Australians: He knocked out International Boxing Hall of Fame member and three division world champion Jeff Fenech in seven rounds on June 7, 1993, and held two wins over former world champion Lester Ellis, one by fourth-round technical knockout.

See also
List of featherweight boxing champions

References

External links

|-

|-

1962 births
Living people
Featherweight boxers
Super-featherweight boxers
Lightweight boxers
World featherweight boxing champions
International Boxing Federation champions
American male boxers
African-American boxers
Boxers from Pennsylvania
People from Coatesville, Pennsylvania
21st-century African-American people
20th-century African-American sportspeople